Turcicornis kopeckyi is a species of beetle in the family Dermestidae, the only species in the genus Turcicornis.

References

Dermestidae